Warley is a ward to the west and northwest of Halifax in the metropolitan borough of Calderdale, West Yorkshire, England.  It contains 32 listed buildings that are recorded in the National Heritage List for England. All the listed buildings are designated at Grade II, the lowest of the three grades, which is applied to "buildings of national importance and special interest".  The ward contains settlements including Warley Town, Mount Tabor, and Pellon, and the surrounding area.  Most of the listed buildings are houses, cottages, farmhouses and farm buildings.  Within the ward are the former Wellesley Barracks, and three structures associated it are listed.  The other listed buildings include churches and associated structures, a former maltings, and a war memorial.


Buildings

References

Citations

Sources

Lists of listed buildings in West Yorkshire